Ctenosaura conspicuosa, commonly known as the San Esteban spinytail iguana is a species of lizard in the family Iguanidae.

Geographic range
Ctenosaura conspicuosa is endemic to San Esteban Island in Mexico.

References

Ctenosaura
Endemic reptiles of Mexico
Endemic fauna of the Baja California Peninsula
Reptiles described in 1919
Taxa named by Mary Cynthia Dickerson
Fauna of Gulf of California islands